George Richmond is a British cinematographer who is noted for his work in Hollywood cinema. He began his career in the film industry as a camera operator. He worked on several films as a second assistant cameraman before eventually making his debut as a cinematographer with The Hide. Some of his notable work includes Ghost Machine, Kingsman: The Secret Service and Kingsman: The Golden Circle, action spy comedies directed by Matthew Vaughn.

Filmography
Feature Films

Television

Other credits

References

External links

Year of birth missing (living people)
Living people
British cinematographers